Théodore Legault (July 26, 1886 – January 17, 1935) was an Ontario merchant and political figure. He represented Sturgeon Falls in the Legislative Assembly of Ontario from 1926 to 1929 as an Independent-Liberal and then Nipissing as a Liberal member from 1934 until his death in 1935.

He was born in Wendover, Ontario, the son of Hormidas Legault. In 1912, he married Estelle Bourdon. He served as mayor of Sturgeon Falls in 1922 and was president of the local Board of Trade. Legault was also a member of the Knights of Columbus.

References 
 Canadian Parliamentary Guide, 1928, AL Normandin

External links 
 

1886 births
1935 deaths
Canadian Roman Catholics
Franco-Ontarian people
Ontario Liberal Party MPPs
Mayors of places in Ontario
People from West Nipissing